Petersham was an electoral district of the Legislative Assembly in the Australian state of New South Wales, named after and including the Sydney suburb of Petersham. It was originally created in 1894, when multi-member districts were abolished, and the four member Canterbury was largely divided between Ashfield, Burwood, Canterbury, Petersham and St George. In 1920, with the introduction of proportional representation, it was absorbed into the five member district of Western Suburbs, along with Ashfield, Dulwich Hill, Leichhardt and Marrickville. It was recreated in 1930, partly replacing Enmore but was abolished in 1941, with parts of the district going to Dulwich Hill and Marrickville.

Members for Petersham

Election results

References

Former electoral districts of New South Wales
Constituencies established in 1894
1894 establishments in Australia
Constituencies disestablished in 1920
1920 disestablishments in Australia
Constituencies established in 1930
1930 establishments in Australia
Constituencies disestablished in 1941
1941 disestablishments in Australia